Georgi Kichukov (born 8 March 1976) is a retired Bulgarian footballer, who played as a midfielder.

External links 
 FootballDatabase.eu profile

1976 births
Living people
Bulgarian footballers
Bulgaria under-21 international footballers
FC Botev Vratsa players
FC Etar Veliko Tarnovo players
PFC Dobrudzha Dobrich players
PFC Svetkavitsa players
PFC Kaliakra Kavarna players
First Professional Football League (Bulgaria) players
Second Professional Football League (Bulgaria) players

Association football midfielders